Isabell Bachor (born 10 July 1983) is a German footballer who plays for LSK Kvinner FK in the Toppserien. She has been active in the Germany women's national football team since 2001.

Playing career

Domestic football
She began her career in SV Erbach, and eventually settled at FSV Frankfurt in 2000. In 2003, she moved to SC 07 Bad Neuenahr. After the 2008–09 season she left Bad Neuenahr, signing a contract at Bayern Munich.

International football
Her international debut occurred on 6 March 2001 against China.  With Germany, they won the bronze medal at the 2004 Summer Olympics in Athens . Bachor also played for Germany at the 2002 FIFA U-20 Women's World Championship. She played for Germany 30 times.

LSK kvinner FK
In 2015 LSK kvinner FK won "the double". And now she is coach for Fjellhamar Girls 2003–02 in Norway.

References

External links
 
 Isabell Bachor at the German Football Association

1983 births
Living people
German women's footballers
German expatriate women's footballers
Olympic bronze medalists for Germany
Footballers at the 2004 Summer Olympics
SC 07 Bad Neuenahr players
FC Bayern Munich (women) players
FSV Frankfurt (women) players
Sportspeople from Trier
Olympic medalists in football
Medalists at the 2004 Summer Olympics
LSK Kvinner FK players
Toppserien players
German expatriate sportspeople in Norway
Expatriate women's footballers in Norway
Germany women's international footballers
Women's association football midfielders
Olympic footballers of Germany
Footballers from Rhineland-Palatinate